Established by President Dwight D. Eisenhower on 27 June 1957 by , the President's Award for Distinguished Federal Civilian Service was created to allow the President to recognize civilian officers or employees of the federal government who have made contributions "so outstanding that the officer or employee is deserving of greater public recognition than that which can be accorded by the head of the department or agency in which he is employed." 

President John F. Kennedy in  directed that potential recipients of the award are recommended to the President by the Distinguished Civilian Service Awards Board, who also had responsibility for recommending people to be awarded the Presidential Medal of Freedom. , by Jimmy Carter, abolished the Distinguished Civilian Service Awards Board and turned over the responsibility for recommending recipients to the Chairman of the United States Civil Service Commission.

The President's Award for Distinguished Federal Civilian Service is the highest honorary award that the Federal Government can grant a career civilian employee. President Kennedy limited the award to only five people per year.

See also 
Awards and decorations of the United States government

References 

Recipients of the President's Award for Distinguished Federal Civilian Service
Civil awards and decorations of the United States
Awards established in 1957